The following highways are numbered 309:

Canada
 Manitoba Provincial Road 309
 Nova Scotia Route 309
 Prince Edward Island Route 309
 Quebec Route 309
 Saskatchewan Highway 309

China
 China National Highway 309

Costa Rica
 National Route 309

India
 National Highway 309 (India)

Japan
 Japan National Route 309

United States
  U.S. Route 309 (former)
  Arkansas Highway 309
  Connecticut Route 309
  Florida State Road 309 (former)
  Georgia State Route 309
  Kentucky Route 309
  Louisiana Highway 309
  Maryland Route 309
  Minnesota State Highway 309
  Mississippi Highway 309
  New Mexico State Road 309
 New York:
  New York State Route 309
  County Route 309 (Erie County, New York)
 County Route 309 (Westchester County, New York)
  Ohio State Route 309
 Ohio State Route 309 (former)
  Pennsylvania Route 309
  Pennsylvania Route 309 Business
  Puerto Rico Highway 309
  South Carolina Highway 309 (former)
  Tennessee State Route 309
 Texas:
  Texas State Highway 309
  Texas State Highway Spur 309
  Farm to Market Road 309
  Utah State Route 309
  Virginia State Route 309